Big Bar Lake Provincial Park is a provincial park in British Columbia, Canada. It includes vehicle accessible camping, a boat launch, swimming, angling, and hiking opportunities. There are 46 campsites within the park in two very close campgrounds.

References

External links

Provincial parks of British Columbia
Thompson-Nicola Regional District